Arminas Urbutis (born 15 May 1986) is a Lithuanian professional basketball player who for Šiauliai of the Lithuanian Basketball League. Standing at 206 cm (6 ft 9 in), Urbutis plays as power forward.

Early life
Urbutis started playing basketball in Kaunas, basketball school. After few years learning basketball in his hometown, he decided went to United States. There he played in Montverde Academy.

College career
Arminas Urbutis played college basketball at the Hofstra University, with the Hofstra Pride.

Playing career
After graduating Hofstra University, Urbutis went to Italy, basketball summer camps, there he was spotted by Bennet Cantù coaching staff. Both sides agreed to sign 1-year deal. He spend 2 season in Bennet Cantù and won silver medals in Serie A.

On August 30, 2019, he has signed with Nevėžis Kėdainiai of the Lithuanian Basketball League.

References

1986 births
Living people
ADA Blois Basket 41 players
Basketball players from Kaunas
BC Juventus players
BC Nevėžis players
BC Prienai players
BC Šiauliai players
Hofstra Pride men's basketball players
Lithuanian expatriate basketball people in France
Lithuanian expatriate basketball people in Italy
Lithuanian expatriate basketball people in the United States
Lithuanian men's basketball players
Montverde Academy alumni
Pallacanestro Cantù players
Power forwards (basketball)
Victoria Libertas Pallacanestro players